The Catalina Island Marine Institute (CIMI) is a non-profit educational program founded in 1979 and run by Guided Discoveries on Santa Catalina Island, California.

It is the host to approximately 15,000 students a year, who visit it in school-organized trips and summer camps. Students at CIMI learn marine biology through activities such snorkeling, scuba diving, sailing, hiking, marine science labs, kayaking and squid dissections.

CIMI operates out of three facilities on Catalina Island: Toyon Bay (a private beach three miles northwest of Avalon), Fox Landing, and Cherry Cove (a camp owned by the Boy Scouts of America). In addition to this, Guided Discoveries also owns and operates AstroCamp California, AstroCamp Virginia, and Camp Motorsport.

References

External links
 Official Catalina Island Marine Institute—CIMI website

Santa Catalina Island (California)
Environmental organizations based in California
Organizations based in Los Angeles County, California
Education in Los Angeles County, California
Natural history of the Channel Islands of California